Baazi may refer to:
 Baazi (1951 film), directed by Guru Dutt and starring Dev Anand
 Baazi (1968 film), directed by Moni Bhattacharjee and starring Dharmendra and Waheeda Rehman
 Baazi (1984 film), directed by Raj N. Sippy and starring Dharmendra
 Baazi (1995 film), directed by Ashutosh Gowarikar and starring Aamir Khan
 Baazi (2021 film), an Indian Bengali film